This is a list of churches in the Wrexham County Borough area of North Wales. This list extends some distance from the town of Wrexham itself.

Active churches 

There is also one Welsh speaking church in Weston Rhyn, Shropshire, another in Chester, another in Birkenhead, two in Liverpool, one in Altrincham and one in Manchester, and the Welsh Presbyterian Church has an English-speaking church in Chester, two on the Wirral and one in Liverpool.

Defunct churches

References 

Wrexham

Wrexham